Jacinto Gutiérrez born in Ponce, Puerto Rico, was a University of Puerto Rico Río Piedras campus Army Reserve Officers' Training Corps cadet who was murdered on 11 March 1971 at the Army Reserve Officers Training Corps building during a riot by groups opposing the program's presence on the campus. During the riots, two Puerto Rico Police officers, Riot Squad commander Juan Birino Mercado and Sergeant Miguel Rosario Rondón, also lost their lives. No one has ever been charged with his killing.

Gutiérrez was buried in his hometown of Ponce at Cementerio La Piedad. His death is frequently commemorated by groups supporting statehood for Puerto Rico.

See also
Antonia Martínez
List of unsolved murders

References

1971 murders in Puerto Rico
1971 deaths
1971 in Puerto Rico
Assassinated Puerto Rican people
Male murder victims
Burials at Cementerio La Piedad
Puerto Rican murder victims
People murdered in Puerto Rico
People from Ponce, Puerto Rico
Unsolved murders in Puerto Rico
Year of birth missing